This is a list of the municipalities in the state of Amapá (AP), located in the North Region of Brazil. Amapá is divided into 16 municipalities, which are grouped into 4 microregions, which are grouped into 2 mesoregions.

Districts

See also

Geography of Brazil
List of cities in Brazil

References

Amapa